The Return To Form Black Magick Party is the first full-length album by the musician Pop Levi (former Super Numeri member, Ladytron bass guitarist and remixer), released on February 2, 2007.

Track listing
"Sugar Assault Me Now" - 3:00
"Blue Honey" - 4:03
"(A Style Called) Cryin' Chic" - 4:56
"Pick Me Up Uppercut" - 3:26
"Skip Ghetto" - 5:21
"Dollar Bill Rock" - 4:54
"Flirting" - 4:10
"Mournin' Light" - 3:32
"See My Lord" - 2:24
"Hades' Lady" - 4:25
"From The Day That You Were Born" - 3:46

Singles
"Blue Honey" (September 4, 2006)
"Sugar Assault Me Now" (January 29, 2007)
"Pick Me Up Uppercut" (April 16, 2007)

External links
Pop Levi's official MySpace website

2007 albums
Pop Levi albums